Professor Lalith Gamage , MBCS, MIEE is a Sri Lankan academic. He is a professor, currently serving as the president and Chief Executive Officer of Sri Lanka Institute of Information Technology, a position he has held since the beginning of the institute in 1999. He has also served as the Chairman of the Arthur C. Clarke Institute for Modern Technologies. As a leading Sri Lankan academic in the field of Computer Science, Prof Gamage has played an important role in the development of IT education, research and industry in Sri Lanka.

Education and research
Educated at St. Aloysius College, Galle, Gamage gained his BSc in Engineering from the University of Moratuwa after which he gained and MSc from the University of Leicester and a PhD from the University of British Columbia. His research areas include Computer Vision, Computational Intelligence and Robotics. Gamage has published numerous research papers and has won a prestigious Japanese Space Agency research award.

Academic career
Joining University of Moratuwa as a lecturer  Gamage went on to serve as a senior lecturer and the Director of the Computing Services Centre of the Moratuwa University. He has also served as a Council Member of the University of Moratuwa.

In 1999 he played a prominent role in establishing Sri Lanka Institute of Information Technology (SLIIT) becoming its CEO and a senior lecturer, in 2003 he was made a Professor of SLIIT. Under his tenure SLIIT has  become  the largest technology institute in Sri Lanka, of which he is the current president.

Currently he also serves as a visiting professor at the Department of Mechanical Engineering, University of British Columbia and is attached to the Industrial Automation Group and is also an adjunct professor of the Curtin University.

Apart from his academic he has served the IT industry and the Government of Sri Lanka in many capacities. These include the Chairman of the ICT Cluster of the USAID sponsored competitiveness initiative, the executive director of Trade Information Network, Sri Lanka Export Development Board, and Chairman of the IT Task Force, Ministry of Enterprise Development, Industrial Policy, and Investment Promotion.

Family
He is married to a daughter of Kingsley Wickramaratne, who was the former Minister of Trade and Commerce and the Governor of the Southern Province.

Awards
 The Outstanding Young Person award for his contribution towards academic development. - 2000
Japanese Space Agency research award.

References

External links
SLIIT faculty
https://web.archive.org/web/20071220003150/http://www.sliit.lk/News/News.htm

Sinhalese academics
Sinhalese engineers
Sri Lankan computer scientists
Alumni of the University of Ceylon
Alumni of the University of Leicester
University of British Columbia alumni
Members of the British Computer Society
Senior Members of the IEEE
Academic staff of the University of British Columbia Faculty of Applied Science
Academic staff of the Sri Lanka Institute of Information Technology
Living people
Alumni of St. Aloysius' College, Galle
Year of birth missing (living people)